Microsoft Baseball 2001 is a baseball game made for the 2000 Major League Baseball season. It was developed and published by Microsoft, following the earlier games Microsoft Baseball 3D 1998 Edition and Microsoft Baseball 2000.

Gameplay
Microsoft Baseball 2001 uses the Baseball Mogul engine, which requires players to act as general manager of an MLB franchise, forcing players to deal with realistic payroll constraints and city-related issues along the way.

Development and release
Microsoft Baseball 2001 was announced in February 2000. It was developed and published by Microsoft for Windows. It was released in March 2000. The cover art features Boston Red Sox shortstop Nomar Garciaparra.

Reception

Aaron Curtiss, writing for Knight Ridder, praised the game's simplicity but considered it inferior to Sammy Sosa High Heat Baseball 2001. Peter Olafson of GamePro wrote that the game "feels unfinished--more like a step in the right direction than a destination."

References

External links
Official homepage (down as of August 2006, via the web archive)
Microsoft Baseball 2001 at MobyGames
https://web.archive.org/web/20060519052845/http://www.sportplanet.com/catchthefever/msbaseball/sbi.shtml

2000 video games
Major League Baseball video games
Microsoft games
North America-exclusive video games
Video games developed in the United States
Windows games
Windows-only games